The 1991–92 OHL season was the 12th season of the Ontario Hockey League. The Dukes of Hamilton relocated, and became the Guelph Storm. Sixteen teams each played 66 games. The Sault Ste. Marie Greyhounds won the J. Ross Robertson Cup, defeating the North Bay Centennials.

Relocation

Hamilton Dukes to Guelph Storm

The Hamilton Dukes relocated to the city of Guelph after two seasons in Hamilton. The club would be renamed to the Guelph Storm and play at the Guelph Memorial Gardens. Guelph had previously hosted an OHL franchise from 1982-1989, the Guelph Platers. The Platers won the 1986 Memorial Cup. The franchise relocated to Owen Sound following the 1988-89 season.

The Storm would remain in the Emms Division.

New Arena

Detroit Compuware Ambassadors
The Detroit Compuware Ambassadors moved into Joe Louis Arena following one season of play at Cobo Arena. This arena was also the home of the Detroit Red Wings of the National Hockey League.

Regular season

Final standings
Note: DIV = Division; GP = Games played; W = Wins; L = Losses; T = Ties; GF = Goals for; GA = Goals against; PTS = Points; x = clinched playoff berth; y = clinched division title

Leyden Division

Emms Division

Scoring leaders

Playoffs

Division quarter-finals

Leyden Division

(2) North Bay Centennials vs. (7) Belleville Bulls

(3) Cornwall Royals vs. (6) Ottawa 67's

(4) Sudbury Wolves vs. (5) Oshawa Generals

Emms Division

(2) Niagara Falls Thunder vs. (7) Detroit Compuware Ambassadors

(3) London Knights vs. (6) Owen Sound Platers

(4) Kitchener Rangers vs. (5) Windsor Spitfires

Division semi-finals

Leyden Division

(1) Peterborough Petes vs. (6) Ottawa 67's

(2) North Bay Centennials vs. (4) Sudbury Wolves

Emms Division

(1) Sault Ste. Marie Greyhounds vs. (4) Kitchener Rangers

(2) Niagara Falls Thunder vs. (3) London Knights

Division finals

Leyden Division

(1) Peterborough Petes vs. (2) North Bay Centennials

Emms Division

(1) Sault Ste. Marie Greyhounds vs. (2) Niagara Falls Thunder

J. Ross Robertson Cup

(E1) Sault Ste. Marie Greyhounds vs. (L2) North Bay Centennials

Awards

1992 OHL Priority Selection
The Guelph Storm held the first overall pick in the 1992 Ontario Priority Selection and selected Jeff O'Neill from the Thornhill Thunderbirds. O'Neill was awarded the Jack Ferguson Award, awarded to the top pick in the draft.

Below are the players who were selected in the first round of the 1992 Ontario Hockey League Priority Selection.

See also
List of OHA Junior A standings
List of OHL seasons
1992 Memorial Cup
1992 NHL Entry Draft
1991 in sports
1992 in sports

References

HockeyDB

Ontario Hockey League seasons
OHL